Crocothemis is a genus of dragonflies in the Libellulidae family,
subfamily Sympetrinae (darters). Various species of this genus occur in southern Europe, Africa, Asia, Australia and the Southwest Pacific. They are generally small to medium-sized dragonflies.

These dragonflies are often noticed due to their colours. Males are generally very brightly coloured, ranging from totally red in several species, to the rich blue of Australia's C. nigrifrons. As with many Libellulid species, the females tend to be dull brown or orange.

Like most libellulids they tend to perch on sticks, reeds or stones near water, flying out to catch insects then returning to their perch.

Species
The genus contains the following species:

References

External links

Libellulidae
Anisoptera genera
Odonata of Africa
Odonata of Asia
Odonata of Oceania
Odonata of Australia
Taxa named by Friedrich Moritz Brauer